Frances Ward may refer to:

 Frances Ward (priest) (born 1959), Anglican priest and theologian
 Frances Ward, 6th Baroness Dudley (died 1697)

See also 
 Frank Ward (disambiguation)